Howard Moss (January 22, 1922 – September 16, 1987) was an American poet, dramatist and critic. He was poetry editor of The New Yorker magazine from 1948 until his death and he won the National Book Award in 1972 for Selected Poems.

Biography
Moss was born in New York City. He attended the University of Michigan, where he won a Hopwood Award. He is credited with discovering a number of major American poets, including Anne Sexton and Amy Clampitt.

W. H. Auden and Chester Kallman co-wrote a famously concise clerihew in his honor:

TO THE POETRY EDITOR OF THE NEW YORKER
Is Robert Lowell
Better than Noël
Coward,
Howard?

According to Edmund White, Moss was a closeted homosexual, a notion exploited in White's thinly disguised roman à clef, The Farewell Symphony, in which the character "Tom" is a prominent New York poetry editor; the "closet" characterization is at odds with the memory of literary friends who remember Moss as openly gay. Moss died of a heart attack.

Bibliography

Poetry
The Wound and the Weather (1946)
The Toy Fair (1954)
A Swimmer in the Air (1957)
A Winter Come, A Summer Gone: Poems, 1946–1960 (1960)
Finding Them Lost and Other Poems (1965)
Second Nature (1968)
Selected Poems (1971) —shared the National Book Award for Poetry with Frank O'Hara, The Collected Poems of Frank O'Hara
Buried City: Poems (1975)
A Swim Off the Rocks -Light verse (1976)
Rules of Sleep (1984)

Plays
The Folding Green (1958)
The Oedipus Mah-Jongg Scandal (1968)
The Palace at 4 A.M. (1972)

Other
The Magic Lantern of Marcel Proust (1963)
Instant Lives & More (1972)
Whatever is Moving (1981)

Musical settings
Ned Rorem's King Midas: a cantata for voice(s) and piano on ten poems of Howard Moss (1961) is one of several settings of Moss's poetry by American composers. Allen Shearer composed his cantata King Midas (1990) on the same set of poems with addition of ancient texts. Morten Lauridsen's A Winter Come (1967) is a setting of six poems of Howard Moss for high voice and piano, while Francis Thorne's Nature Studies: Three Poems of Howard Moss (1981) is for mezzo-soprano, flute and harp.

References

1922 births
1987 deaths
American magazine editors
American gay writers
National Book Award winners
Writers from New York City
University of Michigan alumni
20th-century American poets
20th-century American dramatists and playwrights
American male dramatists and playwrights
American male poets
LGBT people from New York (state)
20th-century American male writers
20th-century American non-fiction writers
American male non-fiction writers
Hopwood Award winners
20th-century American LGBT people
Members of the American Academy of Arts and Letters